Renée of France (25 October 1510 – 12 June 1574), was Duchess of Ferrara from 31 October 1534 until 3 October 1559 by marriage to Ercole II d'Este, grandson of Pope Alexander VI. She was the younger surviving child of Louis XII of France and the duchess regnant Anne of Brittany. In her later life, she became an important supporter of the Protestant Reformation and ally of John Calvin.

Background
Renée was born on 25 October 1510 at the Château de Blois, Blois, Touraine and was the second daughter of Louis XII of France and Anne of Brittany. Anne, who had always fought fiercely to keep Brittany independent of the French crown, tried to will the duchy to Renée, but Louis prevented this, passing the Duchy to her elder sister, Claude.

Her early education was undertaken by her governess, Michelle de Saubonne, Madame de Soubise. Saubonne was a partisan of Anne of Brittany and opposed to Anne's enemy, Louise of Savoy; so, after the death of Renée's parents, Louise and her son, Francis I of France, had Saubonne sacked. Renée never forgot this, and when she married, she took Saubonne with her.

In return for renouncing her claims to the duchy of Brittany, Renée was granted the duchy of Chartres by Francis. As a child, one of her companions was the young Anne Boleyn, whom Renée always remembered with kindness and affection. She was considered as a possible bride for King Henry VIII.

Duchess of Ferrara 
She was married in April 1528 to Ercole II, Duke of Ferrara, eldest son of Alfonso I d'Este and Lucrezia Borgia. By this marriage, she became known as Renata di Francia. Renée received from Francis I an ample dowry and annuity. Thus the court that she assembled about her in Ferrara, in the 1530s and 1540s, corresponded to the tradition which the cultivation of science and art implicitly required, including scholars like Bernardo Tasso and Fulvio Pellegrini. Her first child, Anna, born in 1531, was followed by Alfonso, in 1533; Lucrezia, 1535; after these, Eleonora and Luigi; whose education she carefully directed.

On 31 October 1534, her father-in-law died and Ercole succeeded to the throne. Hardly had he rendered his oath of allegiance to Pope Paul III when he turned against the French at his own court, many of whom had been brought by Renee. Both their number and influence displeased him; and, besides, he found them too expensive; so he by direct or indirect means secured their dismissal, including the poet Clément Marot. And while the Curia was urging the duke to put away the French that were suspected of heresy against Roman Catholicism, there came to Ferrara the Protestant theologian John Calvin, whose journey to Italy must have fallen in March and April 1536. Calvin passed several weeks at the court of Renée in the summer of 1536. As a result of Renée's tutelage, Calvin's opus magnum circulated at the court; the Institutes of the Christian Religion, in two Latin editions (1536, 1539). This at a time when the persecution of those who adhered or sympathised with the Protestant faith had already begun in the area. Amongst those, it included a chorister by the name of Jehannet, also one Cornillan, of the attendants of the duchess, together with a cleric of Tournay, Bouchefort, who were also taken prisoners and tried. In a "man of small stature," whom the Inquisition likewise seized as under suspicion, although he made his escape, is to be recognized not Calvin, but Clément Marot.

Heresy trial 
Renée was not only in correspondence with a very large number of Protestants abroad, with intellectual sympathizers like Vergerio, Camillo Renato, Giulio di Milano, and Francis Dryander, but also that on two or three occasions, about 1550 or later, she partook of the Eucharist in the Protestant manner together with her daughters and fellow believers. Meanwhile, notwithstanding its external splendor, her life had grown sad. The last of her French guests, the daughter and son-in-law of Madame de Soubise of Pons, had been obliged, in 1543, by the constraint imposed by the duke, to leave the court. The Counter-Reformation, which had been operative in Rome since 1542, led to the introduction of a special court of the Inquisition at Ferrara, in 1545, through which, in 1550 and 1551, death sentences were decreed against Protestant sympathizers (Fannio of Faenza and Giorgio of Sicily), and executed by the secular arm.

Finally Duke Ercole lodged accusation against Renée before her nephew King Henry II of France, and through the Inquisitor Oriz, whom the king charged with this errand, Renée was arrested as a heretic, and declared forfeit of all possessions unless she recanted. She resisted steadfastly for some time, until her two daughters were taken away from her, supposedly forever. So, as a condition for being reunited with her children she had to recant and abjure her Protestant faith. She then yielded, made confession on 23 September 1554, although subsequently she refused to attend Catholic worship, and especially the mass, which for her was a form of blasphemy. "How seldom is there an example of steadfastness among aristocrats," wrote Calvin to Farel under date of 2 February 1555.

Return to France 
Renée's longing to return home was not satisfied until a year after the death of her husband on 3 October 1559. In France she found her eldest daughter's husband Francis, Duke of Guise, at the head of the Roman Catholic party. His power was broken by the death of his nephew Francis II in December 1560, so that Renée was able to provide Protestant worship at her estate Montargis, engaging a capable preacher by application to Calvin. She acted as a benefactress for the surrounding Protestants,  making her castle a refuge for them when her son-in-law once again lit the torch of war.

Again, her conduct won Calvin's praise (10 May 1563), and she is one of the frequently recurring figures in his correspondence of that period; he repeatedly shows recognition of her intervention in behalf of the Evangelical cause; and one of his last writings in the French tongue, dispatched from his deathbed (4 April 1564), is addressed to her. While Renée continued unmolested in the second religious war (1567), in the third (1568–70) her castle was no longer respected as an asylum for her fellow believers. On the other hand, she succeeded in rescuing a number of them from the massacre of Saint Bartholomew's night, when she happened to be in Paris. They left her personally undisturbed at that time, though Catherine de' Medici still sought to move her to retract, a demand which she ignored.

Children

With Ercole II she had:
Anna d'Este, 16 November 1531 – 1607,  married firstly, Francis, Duke of Guise until 1563, married secondly Jacques de Savoie, 2nd Duc de Nemours
Alfonso II, Duke of Ferrara, 22 November 1533 – 1597
Lucrezia Maria d'Este, 16 December 1535 – 1598, married Francesco Maria II della Rovere, Duke of Urbino.
Eleonore d'Este, 1537-1581
Luigi d'Este, 21 December 1538 – 1586, Bishop of Ferrara and Archbishop of Auch

Renee was widowed in 1559. As a result of being on bad terms with her son, Alfonso, she returned to France in 1560 and settled in Montargis, where she then died on 12 June 1574.

Ancestry

Notes

References

Sources

|-

|-

|-

1510 births
1574 deaths
French princesses
French evangelicals
Hereditary Princesses of Modena
People from Blois
House of Valois-Orléans
Countesses of Chartres
Converts to Calvinism from Roman Catholicism
French Calvinist and Reformed Christians
Duchesses of Ferrara
Duchesses of Modena
Duchesses of Reggio
Duchesses of Chartres
Daughters of kings
Dukes of Chartres
People of the Protestant Reformation